Pair skating was contested between 13 and 15 February 1994. 18 pairs from 10 nations participated.

Results

Referees
 Jürg Wilhelm
 Walburga Grim (assistant referee)

Judges
 Vera Spurná
 Alfred Korytek
 Monika Zeidler 
 Elaine DeMore
 Frances Dafoe
 Alexei Shirshov
 Robert Worsfold 
 Marina Sanaya
 Donald McKnight
 Monique Georgelin (substitute)

P
1994 in figure skating
1994
Mixed events at the 1994 Winter Olympics